Aetheolaena involucrata is a species of flowering plant in the aster family, Asteraceae. It is endemic to Ecuador, where it is considered to be "characteristic" of the Andean flora.

This plant is a subshrub or vine which grows in forest and shrubland habitat at altitudes up to 4500 meters. It is widely distributed and grows in several protected areas.

References

involucrata
Endemic flora of Ecuador
Taxonomy articles created by Polbot